Kaylen Miles Hinds (born 28 January 1998) is an English professional footballer who plays as a striker for Hemel Hempstead Town.

Early and personal life
He was born in Brent and grew up in Islington.

Club career
Hinds joined Premier League side Arsenal from the youth system of Leyton Orient as an under-14 in 2012. He signed a professional contract of undisclosed length in February 2015 and another prior to joining Stevenage on loan in January 2017.

On 8 July 2017, Hinds joined Bundesliga side VfL Wolfsburg on a three-year deal.

On 31 January 2018, Hinds joined Regionalliga Bayern side SpVgg Greuther Fürth II, the second team of 2. Bundesliga side SpVgg Greuther Fürth, on loan until the end of the 2017–18 season.

On 6 September 2018, Wolfsburg terminated Hinds's contract after an unauthorised week-long absence, with club managing director Jörg Schmadtke stating that "he has not fulfilled his contractual obligations despite repeated requests. We do not tolerate such behaviour."

In August 2019, Hinds signed for Premier League side Watford on a one-year contract with the club holding the option of a one-year extension. On 23 January 2020, he made his debut for Watford in a 2–1 FA Cup third round replay defeat away at Tranmere Rovers. Coming on as half-time substitute for Tom Dele-Bashiru, Hinds scored in the 68th minute to level the tie before Tranmere scored an extra-time winner. He was released by Watford in June 2020.

On 2 April 2021 he signed for National League side Aldershot Town, making his debut off of the bench that day in a 2–1 defeat to Stockport County. In August 2021, he signed for National League South side Welling United, before dropping down a division in January 2022 to sign for Southern League Premier Division South club Hayes & Yeading United.

In January 2023, he returned to the National League South with Hemel Hempstead Town following a spell with Haringey Borough.

International career
Hinds has represented England at youth international levels, including under-17, where he was part of the 2015 FIFA U-17 World Cup squad. He has also played at under-18 level.

Career statistics

References

1998 births
Living people
English footballers
Arsenal F.C. players
Stevenage F.C. players
VfL Wolfsburg players
SpVgg Greuther Fürth players
Watford F.C. players
Aldershot Town F.C. players
Welling United F.C. players
Hayes & Yeading United F.C. players
Haringey Borough F.C. players
Hemel Hempstead Town F.C. players
English Football League players
Bundesliga players
Regionalliga players
National League (English football) players
Southern Football League players
Isthmian League players
Association football forwards
England youth international footballers
English expatriate footballers
English expatriate sportspeople in Germany
Expatriate footballers in Germany
Black British sportspeople